Grant Township is a township in Nodaway County, in the U.S. state of Missouri.

Grant Township has the name of General Ulysses S. Grant.

References

Townships in Missouri
Townships in Nodaway County, Missouri